This is a list of former municipalities of Montenegro, i.e. municipalities that no longer exist.

Former Municipalities

References 

 

Montenegro
Municipalities